Sir Alan Arthur Bates  (17 February 1934 – 27 December 2003) was an English actor who came to prominence in the 1960s, when he appeared in films ranging from the popular children's story Whistle Down the Wind to the "kitchen sink" drama A Kind of Loving.

He is also known for his performance with Anthony Quinn in Zorba the Greek, as well as his roles in King of Hearts, Georgy Girl, Far From the Madding Crowd and The Fixer, for which he received an Academy Award nomination for Best Actor. In 1969, he starred in the Ken Russell film Women in Love with Oliver Reed and Glenda Jackson.

Bates went on to star in The Go-Between, An Unmarried Woman, Nijinsky and in The Rose with Bette Midler, as well as many television dramas, including The Mayor of Casterbridge, Harold Pinter's The Collection, A Voyage Round My Father, An Englishman Abroad (as Guy Burgess) and Pack of Lies. He also appeared on the stage, notably in the plays of Simon Gray, such as Butley and Otherwise Engaged.

Early life 

Bates was born at the Queen Mary Nursing Home, Darley Abbey, Derby, England, on 17 February 1934, the eldest of three boys born of Florence Mary (née Wheatcroft), a housewife and a pianist, and Harold Arthur Bates, an insurance broker and a cellist. They lived in Allestree, Derby, at the time of Bates' birth, but briefly moved to Mickleover before returning to Allestree.

Both parents were amateur musicians who encouraged Bates to pursue music. However, by the age of 11, having decided to become an actor, he studied drama instead. He further developed his vocation by attending productions at Derby's Little Theatre.

Bates was educated at the Herbert Strutt Grammar School, Derby Road, Belper, Derbyshire (now "Strutts", a volunteer led business and community centre) and later gained a scholarship to the Royal Academy of Dramatic Art in London, where he studied with Albert Finney and Peter O'Toole, before leaving to join the RAF for National Service at RAF Newton.

Career

Early stage appearances
Bates's stage debut was in 1955, in You and Your Wife, in Coventry.

In 1956 he made his West End debut as Cliff in Look Back in Anger, a role he had originated at the Royal Court and which made him a star. He also played the role on television (for the ITV Play of the Week) and on Broadway. He also was a member of the 1967 acting company at the Stratford Festival in Canada, playing the title role in Richard III.

Television
In the late 1950s Bates appeared in several plays for television in Britain in shows such as ITV Play of the Week, Armchair Theatre and  ITV Television Playhouse.

In 1960 appeared as Giorgio in the final episode of The Four Just Men (TV series) entitled Treviso Dam.

Bates made his feature film debut in The Entertainer (1960) opposite Laurence Olivier, his first film role. Bates worked for the Padded Wagon Moving Company in the early 1960s while acting at the Circle in the Square Theatre in New York City.

Film stardom
Bates played the lead in his second feature, Whistle Down the Wind (1961), directed by Bryan Forbes. He followed it with the lead in A Kind of Loving (1962), directed by John Schlesinger. Both films were very popular, establishing Bates as a film star.

Film critics cited the 1963 film noir, The Running Man, as being one of Alan Bates' finest performances. The film starred Laurence Harvey, Lee Remick and Bates in the supporting role of Stephen Maddox, an insurance company investigator who encounters Harvey and Remick in Spain after Harvey successfully faked his death in an aeroplane crash to cash in on a life insurance policy, leaving wife Lee Remick a small fortune. Fans of film noir enjoyed the many intriguing twists and turns The Running Man offered. The film also offered movie fans a depth of character study worthy of a memorable film noir. Bates' character worked well with Harvey and Remick, helping director Carol Reed craft an ever-guessing, suspenseful story of cat and mouse detective work that moved seamlessly from beginning to end. While many movies in film noir have predictable plots, The Running Man featured a plot that was unpredictable, which was its best asset. The film's finale saw Lee Remick standing wearily on a dock, looking at a departing boat with the Rock of Gibraltar looming in the background.

Bates went into an adaptation of Harold Pinter's The Caretaker (1963) with Donald Pleasence and Robert Shaw. It was directed by Clive Donner who then made Nothing But the Best (1964) with Bates.

He supported Anthony Quinn in Zorba the Greek (1964) and James Mason in Georgy Girl (1966). Bates returned to TV doing episodes of Wednesday Theatre and starred in Philippe de Broca's King of Hearts (1966).

Bates was reunited with Schlesinger in Far From the Madding Crowd (1967), starring Julie Christie then did the Bernard Malamud film The Fixer (1968), which earned him an Academy Award nomination for Best Actor.

In 1969 he starred in Women in Love directed by Ken Russell with Oliver Reed and Glenda Jackson, in which Bates and Reed wrestled naked. He followed it appearing as Col. Vershinin in the National Theatre's film of Three Sisters, directed by and co-starring Laurence Olivier.

Bates was handpicked by director John Schlesinger (with whom he had previously worked on A Kind of Loving and Far From The Madding Crowd) to play the starring role of Dr. Daniel Hirsh in the film Sunday Bloody Sunday (1971). Bates was held up filming The Go-Between (1971) for director Joseph Losey alongside Christie, and had also become a father around that time, and so he had to refuse the role. (The part then went first to Ian Bannen, who balked at kissing and simulating sex with another man, and then to Peter Finch who earned an Academy Award nomination for the role.)

Bates starred in the film of A Day in the Death of Joe Egg (1972) and produced and appeared in a short, Second Best (1972).

He starred in Story of a Love Story (1973), and some play adaptations, Butley (1974) and In Celebration (1975). He was the villain in Royal Flash (1975) and appeared on television in Plays for Today and the Laurence Olivier Presents version of Harold Pinter's The Collection (1976).

Television
Bates starred in the TV movie Piccadilly Circus (1977) and The Mayor of Casterbridge (1978). In the latter he played Michael Henchard, the ultimately-disgraced lead, which he described as his favourite role.

He starred in such international films as An Unmarried Woman (1978) and Nijinsky (1980), and also played Bette Midler's ruthless business manager in the film The Rose (1979). He was also in The Shout (1979) and Very Like a Whale (1980).

He played two diametrically opposed roles in An Englishman Abroad (1983), as Guy Burgess, a member of the Cambridge spy ring exiled in Moscow, and in Pack of Lies (1987), as a British Secret Service agent tracking several Soviet spies. He continued working in film and television in the 1990s, including the role of Claudius in Mel Gibson's version of Hamlet (1990), though most of his roles in this era were more low-key.

Later career
In 2001 Bates joined an all-star cast in Robert Altman's critically acclaimed period drama Gosford Park, in which he played the butler Jennings. He later played Antonius Agrippa in the 2004 TV film Spartacus, but died before it premiered. The film was dedicated to his memory and that of writer Howard Fast, who wrote the original novel that inspired the film Spartacus by Stanley Kubrick.

On stage Bates had a particular association with the plays of Simon Gray, appearing in Butley, Otherwise Engaged, Stage Struck, Melon, Life Support and Simply Disconnected, as well as the film of Butley and Gray's TV series Unnatural Pursuits. In Otherwise Engaged, his co-star was Ian Charleson, who became a friend, and Bates later contributed a chapter to a 1990 book on his colleague after Charleson's early death.

Bates was made a Commander of the Order of the British Empire (CBE) in 1996, and was knighted in 2003. He was an Associate Member of RADA and was a patron of The Actors Centre, Covent Garden, London, from 1994 until his death in 2003.

Personal life 
Bates was married to actress Victoria Ward from 1970 until her death from a heart attack in 1992, although they had separated many years earlier. They had twin sons, born in November 1970, the actors Benedick Bates and Tristan Bates. Tristan died following an asthma attack in Tokyo in 1990.

Bates had numerous gay relationships, including those with actor Nickolas Grace and Olympic skater John Curry as detailed in Donald Spoto's authorised biography  Otherwise Engaged: The Life of Alan Bates. Spoto characterised Bates's sexuality as ambiguous, and said, "he loved women but enjoyed his closest relationships with men". Even after homosexuality was partially decriminalised in England in 1967, Bates rigorously avoided interviews and questions about his personal life, and even denied to his male lovers that there was a homosexual component in his nature. Throughout his life Bates sought to be regarded as a ladies' man or at least as a man who, as an actor, could appear attractive to and attracted by women. He also chose many roles with an aspect of homosexuality or bisexuality, including the role of Rupert in the 1969 film Women in Love and the role of Frank in the 1988 film We Think the World of You.

In the later years of his life, Bates had a relationship with the Welsh actress Angharad Rees.

Death 
Bates died of pancreatic cancer in December 2003 after going into a coma. He is buried at All Saints' Church, Bradbourne in Derbyshire.

Otherwise Engaged: The Life of Alan Bates 
Donald Spoto's 2007 book, Otherwise Engaged: The Life of Alan Bates, is a posthumous authorised biography of Alan Bates. It was written with the cooperation of his son Benedick and includes more than one hundred interviews, such as those with Michael Linnit and Rosalind Chatto.

Tristan Bates Theatre 
Bates and his family created the Tristan Bates Theatre at the Actors' Centre in Covent Garden, in memory of his son Tristan who died at the age of 19. Tristan's twin brother, Benedick, is a vice-director.

Filmography

Film

Television

Awards 
 1959 Clarence Derwent Award for A Long Day's Journey into Night
 1971 Evening Standard Best Actor Award for Butley
 1972 Best Actor Tony for Butley (a performance he recreated in the film version of the same name, Butley in 1974)
 1975 Variety Club Award for Otherwise Engaged
 1983 Variety Club Award for A Patriot for Me
 2000 Drama Desk and Lucille Lortel Award for Unexpected Man
 2002 Best Actor Tony and Drama Desk, for Fortune's Fool

References

External links 

 
 
 
 

1934 births
2003 deaths
Actors awarded knighthoods
Alumni of RADA
Audiobook narrators
Bisexual male actors
Deaths from cancer in England
Deaths from pancreatic cancer
Drama Desk Award winners
English male film actors
English male radio actors
English male stage actors
English male television actors
English male voice actors
English LGBT actors
BAFTA winners (people)
Knights Bachelor
Commanders of the Order of the British Empire
Outstanding Performance by a Cast in a Motion Picture Screen Actors Guild Award winners
People from Allestree
Royal Shakespeare Company members
English male Shakespearean actors
Tony Award winners
20th-century English male actors
21st-century English male actors